Francis William Kellogg (May 30, 1810 – January 13, 1879) was a U.S. Representative from the states of Michigan, during the Civil War, and Alabama, during Reconstruction.

Biography
Kellogg was born in Worthington, Massachusetts and attended the common schools. He moved to Columbus, Ohio, in 1833 and then to Grand Rapids, Michigan, in 1855 where he engaged in the lumber business with the firm Kellogg, White & Co. at Kelloggville (which was named after him) in Kent County, Michigan. He was a member of the Michigan State House of Representatives in 1857 and 1858.

Kellogg was elected from Michigan as a Republican to United States House of Representatives for the 36th, 37th, and 38th Congresses, serving from March 4, 1859 to March 3, 1865. He represented Michigan's 3rd congressional district for his first two terms, then the 4th district after a redistricting. In all three contests, he defeated the former mayor of Grand Rapids, Thomas B. Church, in the general election.  During the American Civil War, he organized the Second, Third, and Sixth Cavalry Regiments by the authority of the United States Department of War. He was appointed as the colonel of the Third Michigan Cavalry.

During Reconstruction, he was appointed by U.S. President Andrew Johnson as collector of internal revenue for the southern district of Alabama on April 30, 1866, and served until July 1868, residing in Mobile, Alabama.

Upon the re-admission of Alabama to the Union, Kellogg was elected to a partial term in Alabama's 1st congressional district to the 40th Congress, serving from July 22, 1868, to March 3, 1869. He was succeeded by fellow Republican Alfred Buck. Kellogg then moved to New York City and later to Alliance, Ohio, where he died. He is interred in Fulton Street Cemetery in Grand Rapids, Michigan.

See also

References
 Retrieved on 2008-02-14

External links
 

The Political Graveyard
Our Campaigns profile

1810 births
1879 deaths
People from Worthington, Massachusetts
Republican Party members of the United States House of Representatives from Michigan
Republican Party members of the United States House of Representatives from Alabama
Members of the Michigan House of Representatives
Union Army colonels
People of Michigan in the American Civil War
19th-century American politicians
Military personnel from Massachusetts